The National Museum of Mongolia; formerly the National Museum of Mongolian History is located in Ulaanbaatar.  It characterizes itself as "a cultural, scientific, and educational organization, which is responsible for the collection, care and interpretation of the objects."

History
The first museum in Mongolia, the Mongolian National Museum (now the Mongolian Natural History Museum), was established in 1924. Russian scholars, such as Pyotr Kozlov, V. I. Lisovskii, A. D. Simukov, and the American researcher Roy Chapman Andrews contributed to the museum's early collections and exhibits.

Exhibitions cover prehistory, pre-Mongol Empire history, Mongol Empire, Mongolia during Qing rule, ethnography and traditional life, and twentieth-century history.  The ethnographic collection has significant displays of the traditional dress of various Mongolian ethnic groups and of snuff bottles.  Most exhibits have labels in both Mongolian and English.  The museum publishes one or more issues of its in-house journal each year, with articles in Mongolian and foreign languages, including Russian and English.

The origins of the National Museum of Mongolia date back to 1924, when the first collections were begun for a national museum. The present building of the museum was built in 1971, when it was erected as the Museum of Revolution. Since April 2008 the museum has been renamed as the National Museum of Mongolia. Permanent collection: The National Museum of Mongolia is the nation's largest museum and holds a collection of over 57,000 objects relating to Central Asian history and the history of Mongolia from prehistory to the end of the 20th century, with a portion of the collected artifacts on display in ten exhibition halls. One collection has significant displays of the traditional dress of various Mongolian ethnic groups, keep your eye out for a Star Wars influence.

In the socialist period, all collections of historical, ethnographical, natural history and paleontological were housed in the building of the State Central Museum, which was built in 1956. 	The historical collection is subdivided into 3 areas: archaeological; medieval history of Mongolia; and modern historical objects and photography, recordings, and documents.

See also
List of museums in Mongolia

References

External links

 Museum website
 The National Museum of Mongolia at Google Cultural Institute

1971 establishments in Mongolia
Museums established in 1971
Museums in Ulaanbaatar
National museums
History museums
History of Mongolia